"All the Right Moves" is a 1983 song by Jennifer Warnes and Chris Thompson with music by Tom Snow and lyrics by Barry Alfonso from the film, All the Right Moves. The single reached No. 85 in the Billboard Hot 100 singles chart in the United States.

References

1983 songs
Jennifer Warnes songs
Songs written for films
Songs written by Tom Snow